Chhotki Ramnaga is a village development committee in Rupandehi District of Lumbini Province, southern (Western development Region) Nepal. At the time of the 1991 Nepal census, it had a population of 4,791 living in 761 households.

Ramjanki Mandir

Ramjanki Mandir is a temple situated in the village. This temple has its own value of Hinduism. Local benefactors donated 54,440 sq.ft. of farm land to the Ramjanki Temple, established in 2009.

References

Populated places in Rupandehi District